Francesco De Masi (11 January 1930 – 6 November 2005) was an Italian conductor and film score composer.

Biography 
He studied composition at the San Pietro a Maiella Conservatory in Naples under the guidance of Achille Longo, his uncle. De Masi became interested in film music when Longo was asked to compose a soundtrack for a film, and he asked De Masi to be his assistant. De Masi's filmography includes scores for over 200 films and TV series, ranging from Spaghetti Westerns and sword and sandal epics to gialli and horror films, such as Lucio Fulci's Lo squartatore di New York (The New York Ripper).

De Masi also scored several action films, such as Enzo G. Castellari's Quel maledetto treno blindato (The Inglorious Bastards), but he is best remembered for his work on Spaghetti Westerns. Unlike most other composers, De Masi started writing western scores slightly earlier than the genre's most influential musician, Ennio Morricone. As De Masi's music was less influenced by Morricone, his style had a distinctive sound. Many of his songs were performed by the low-voiced member of the I Cantori Moderni choir, Ettore "Raoul" Lovecchio.

De Masi was also very interested in classical music. He taught at the Santa Cecilia Conservatory, also conducting the conservatory's orchestra. In an interview, De Masi listed Palestrina, Karlheinz Stockhausen, Ravel and Shostakovich as his main classical influences.

De Masi died of cancer at the age of 75.

Selected filmography

References

External links 
 

1930 births
2005 deaths
Italian film score composers
Italian male film score composers
Spaghetti Western composers
Deaths from cancer in Lazio
Italian male conductors (music)
20th-century Italian conductors (music)
20th-century Italian male musicians